The Club at Nevillewood is a private golf and residential club located in Presto, Pennsylvania, outside Pittsburgh.  It was founded in 1992 and has an 18 hole championship golf course designed by Jack Nicklaus.

Club history
Jack Nicklaus came to the Collier Township area in the late 1980s when he was invited by developers like Rick Stambrosky, his father, George, and partner Mike Dempster.  They met with Nicklaus and decided to build a championship-caliber golf course in the Pittsburgh area surrounded by custom built homes.  Close to one million cubic yards of earth was moved to make way for the club, which opened for play in 1992.

From 1998 until 2005, the club was the host site for the annual Mario Lemieux Celebrity Invitational, which was an event on the Celebrity Players Tour.  The tournament raised millions of dollars for cancer research over the eight years of the tournament.

The course today
The streets on the site of the club are named after many of the Jack Nicklaus-designed courses.

Scorecard

Trivia
The ninth hole at the club was recently named one of the Bear's Best, a collection of the greatest holes designed by Jack Nicklaus.

References

External links
 Official site

Buildings and structures in Allegheny County, Pennsylvania
Golf clubs and courses in Pennsylvania
Golf clubs and courses designed by Jack Nicklaus